The Jaeger Machine Company Office Building is a historic building in the Arena District neighborhood of Columbus, Ohio. It was listed on the National Register of Historic Places in 1983.

The two-story concrete building was constructed in 1936. It was designed simply and affordably, but with Art Deco features for a modern design. The design was by O. G. Mandt, company president, and Lyon Gardner, an engineer. The company was founded in 1906 and successfully produced cement mixers. It declined over time, finally shuttering in 1992.

The building stands as a rare example of the Art Deco movement for industrial buildings in Columbus.

See also
 National Register of Historic Places listings in Columbus, Ohio

References

External links
 

Commercial buildings on the National Register of Historic Places in Ohio
Commercial buildings completed in 1936
National Register of Historic Places in Columbus, Ohio
Buildings in downtown Columbus, Ohio